Tapis (or simply ) is a traditional Tenun style and also refers to resulting cloth that originated from Lampung, Indonesia. It consists of a striped, naturally-coloured cloth embroidered with warped and couched gold thread. Traditionally using floral motifs, it has numerous variations. It is generally worn ceremonially, although it can be used as a decoration. It is considered one of the symbols of Lampung and Lampungese.

Production

Tapis is generally made by Lampungese women. It consists of a woven, naturally coloured fabric with warped gold and silk embroidery. The gold thread, shaped in stripes, chevrons, and checks, contrasts the colours of the fabric. Tapis can also be decorated with beads, mica chips, or old colonial coins.

The gold embroidery is affixed using couching techniques, minimalizing waste. The gold thread is attached in sections, then couched with a different, less expensive, thread at turns. This ensures that none of the gold thread is used in a non-visible area.

Traditionally, tapis has floral motifs. However, modern tapis may also be based on the weaver's own design and include non-floral motifs, such as Arabic calligraphy. Other designs may include snakes, ships, and mythical creatures. Some tapis, called tapis tua (old tapis), are covered entirely in golden embroidery.

Although generally produced by Lampungese home industries, tapis is also produced in other areas, including Kendal, Central Java and Pisang Island.

Use

Traditionally, tapis is worn as a sarong for weddings, Eid ul-Fitr celebrations, and welcoming ceremonies. However, tapis can also be used as a wall decoration. When worn, it forms a cylinder around the wearer's legs.

Reception
 has come to be seen as a symbol of Lampung. Some people describes  as having "exceptional beauty and sophistication", while some describes viewing  as "like seeing countless possibilities in art and life portrayed in cloth".

The price of  reflects its age. Generally, the older a  the more it costs. Antique  are also collectors items, collected by both Indonesians and foreigners.

Gallery

See also

 Ulos
 Ikat
 Batik
 Songket

References
Footnotes

Bibliography

Indonesian clothing
Textile industry of Indonesia